KDE Telepathy  is an instant messaging (IM) and voice over IP (VoIP) client which supports text, voice, video, file transfers, and inter-application communication over various IM protocols. It uses the Telepathy framework as its back-end. It is the slated replacement for Kopete, and its main focus is the integration between different components of the KDE Software Compilation that may benefit from real-time communication and collaboration features.

Themes

KDE Telepathy has support for Adium themes. They can be installed from the Adium website's Xtras page's Themes category. They are installed over ktp-adiumxtra-protocol-handler

Protocol support

Gadu-Gadu - over telepathy-haze
Skype for Business - over telepathy-haze
Telegram Messenger - over telepathy-morse
Skype - over telepathy-haze
ICQ - over telepathy-haze
Bonjour - over telepathy-salut
XMPP - over telepathy-gabble (broken X-OAuth2)
Yahoo! Messenger - over telepathy-haze
AIM - over telepathy-haze

See also

Comparison of instant messaging clients
Comparison of Internet Relay Chat clients

References

External links

2011 software
Applications using D-Bus
Extragear
Free instant messaging clients
Free Internet Relay Chat clients
Free software programmed in C
Free VoIP software
Instant messaging clients for Linux
Internet Relay Chat clients
Unix Internet Relay Chat clients
Videotelephony